James Timothy Haggarty (April 14, 1914 – March 8, 1998) was a Canadian ice hockey player who competed in the 1936 Winter Olympics. He later played five games in the National Hockey League for the Montreal Canadiens. He was born in Port Arthur, Ontario.

Haggarty was a member of the 1936 Port Arthur Bearcats, which won the silver medal for Canada in ice hockey at the 1936 Winter Olympics. In 1987 he was inducted into the Northwestern Ontario Sports Hall of Fame as a member of that Olympic team.

References

External links

1914 births
1998 deaths
Canadian ice hockey forwards
Ice hockey people from Ontario
Sportspeople from Thunder Bay
Ice hockey players at the 1936 Winter Olympics
Medalists at the 1936 Winter Olympics
Montreal Canadiens players
Olympic ice hockey players of Canada
Olympic medalists in ice hockey
Olympic silver medalists for Canada